Rockland Farm is a historic home and farm complex located at Westminster, Carroll County, Maryland, United States. The complex consists of a brick house, the stone foundation of an 18th-century springhouse, as well as a large frame barn and a corn crib, both dating to the late 19th century. The house, built in 1795, retains the Pennsylvania German traditional three-room plan with a central chimney. It is a two-story, three-bay by two-bay brick structure on a stone foundation built into a slope.

Rockland Farm was listed on the National Register of Historic Places in 1986.

References

External links
, including photo from 1978, at Maryland Historical Trust

Farms on the National Register of Historic Places in Maryland
Houses in Carroll County, Maryland
Houses completed in 1795
Pennsylvania Dutch culture in Maryland
Westminster, Maryland
National Register of Historic Places in Carroll County, Maryland
1795 establishments in Maryland